Freakonomics Radio is an American public radio program and podcast network which discusses socioeconomic issues for a general audience. The show is a spin-off of the 2005 book Freakonomics.  Journalist Stephen Dubner hosts the show, with economist Steven Levitt as a regular guest. The show is primarily distributed as a podcast, and is among the most popular on iTunes. Created in September 2010, it is a weekly podcast.
From July 2018, production moved from WNYC to Stitcher Radio; Freakonomics is released at 11 p.m. on Wednesday each week. You can find the podcast on iTunes, Spotify, Google Play, and on their website.

A gameshow episode "Tell Me Something I Don't Know" was broadcast on October 6, 2014.  The show was hosted at The Greene Space in New York City.  In the show, selected audience members presented their ideas to host Stephen Dubner and a panel of three celebrity judges.  The winner of the episode was a 12-year-old who competed alongside former New York Governor Patterson.

Podcasts 
As of 2023, the radio hosts the following shows:
Freakonomics, with Dubner.
People I (Mostly) Admire, with Levitt.
No Stupid Questions, with Dubner and Angela Duckworth.
Sudhir Breaks the Internet, with Sudhir Venkatesh.
Footy for Two, with Dubner and his son Solomon.
Question of the Day, with Dubner and James Altucher.
The Economics of Everyday Things, with journalist Zachary Crockett
Tell Me Something I Don't Know is no longer active.

References

External links
 

2009 podcast debuts
Audio podcasts
Business and finance podcasts
Radio programs about economics
NPR programs
WNYC Studios programs